USS Sassacus (YT-193) was a tugboat built for the U.S. Navy during World War II.

Sassacus was laid down on 21 April 1942 by Ira S. Bushey and Son, Brooklyn, New York; launched on 31 July 1942; and delivered to the Navy and placed in service on 7 December 1942.

Service history

Assigned initially to the 3d Naval District and redesignated YTB-193 on 15 May 1944, Sassacus remained in the New York area until early 1945. Then reallocated to the 12th Naval District, she moved south; transited the Panama Canal; and assumed harbor tug duties in the San Francisco area. A year and a half later, however, she was ordered inactivated and was placed out of service, in reserve, on 26 November 1946. Redesignated YTM-193 in February 1962, she remained in reserve until transferred, on loan, to the government of Venezuela in January 1963, where she remained until 1974.

References

1942 ships
Tugs of the United States Navy